Alex Mitchell (born 25 May 1997) is an English professional rugby union player who plays as a  scrum-half for Premiership club Northampton Saints since 2015.

Domestic career
His older brother James Mitchell is also a professional rugby union player who joined Northampton Saints from Connacht during the 2019 Rugby World Cup. Alex Mitchell was educated at Lymm High School. During his time at Lymm, he played against Tom Curry and Ben Curry in the NatWest Schools Cup, where Lymm lost to Oundle School at the Quarter Final stage.

Mitchell was formerly a member of the Sale Sharks system before joining the Northampton Saints academy in 2015. His debut season of 2017–2018 saw him make nine appearances for Northampton. On 17 March 2019 Mitchell was a member of the side that defeated Saracens in the final of the Premiership Rugby Cup.

International career
Mitchell represented England at under-16, under-17 and under-18 level. He received his first call-up to the England under-20 team in October 2015 and was a member of the side that completed the grand slam during the 2017 Six Nations Under 20s Championship. Mitchell was also a member of the squad at the 2017 World Rugby Under 20 Championship, scoring tries in pool fixtures against Samoa and Wales. He also scored tries in the semi-final against South Africa and defeat against New Zealand in the final as England finished runners up.

In June 2019 Mitchell started for an England XV in the non-cap Quilter Cup against the Barbarians at Twickenham. In October 2020 Mitchell was called up to a senior England training squad by head coach Eddie Jones and following an injury to Willi Heinz, Mitchell was called into the squad as backup to Ben Youngs and Dan Robson for the conclusion of the 2020 Six Nations Championship.

On 31 October 2021 Mitchell was called up to the England squad for their 2021 Autumn Nations Series match against Tonga, replacing the injured Harry Randall. He made his England debut off the bench against Tonga and scored a try on his debut as part of England's 69-3 victory.

International tries

References

External links

Northampton Saints profile

1997 births
Living people
English people of Irish descent
English rugby union players
England international rugby union players
Northampton Saints players
Rugby union players from Maidstone
Rugby union scrum-halves